Counterspy was an espionage drama radio series that aired on the NBC Blue Network (later ABC) and Mutual from May 18, 1942, to November 29, 1957.

David Harding (played by Don MacLaughlin) was the chief of the United States Counterspies, a unit engaged during World War II in counterintelligence against Japan's Black Dragon and Germany's Gestapo. United States Counterspies was a fictional government agency devised by the program's creator, Phillips H. Lord after Lord "had a certain amount of difficulty with J. Edgar Hoover over story content in Gang Busters." Mandel Kramer played Peters, Harding's assistant.

The program's plots progressed through three phases. During World War II they involved "threats from the Axis powers." After the war ended, Cold War threats took precedence. In the third phase, "they addressed all manner of illegal activities.

Scriptwriters for the series included Milton J. Kramer, Emile C. Tepperman and Stanley Niss.

Adaptations
The radio drama was adapted to film twice, as David Harding, Counterspy (July 1950) and as Counterspy Meets Scotland Yard (November 1950). Both Columbia Pictures productions starred Howard St. John in the title role.

An unsuccessful pilot for a television version of Counterspy was produced in England in 1958, with Don Megowan as David Harding. The trade publication Broadcasting also reported on plans of Bernard L. Schubert Inc. to produce 39 episodes of David Harding, Counterspy with Reed Hadley in the title role and Telestar Films' releasing of Counterspy for syndication.

A Spanish version of Counterspy was transmitted to South America via shortwave radio in 1942. An article in Broadcasting reported that commercial were deleted and that the effort was "in cooperation with the Office of the Coordinator of Inter-American Affairs."

References

External links

Logs
Jerry Haendiges Vintage Radio Logs: Counterspy
Episodic log of Counterspy from RadioGOLDINdex
Episodic logs of Counterspy (and more) from The Digital Deli Too

Audio
Times Past Old Radio: Counterspy
Script of "Case of the Framed Congressman" episode of Counterspy
Zoot Radio, free old time radio show downloads of "David Harding Counter Spy"

TV pilots
Pilot of TV version of David Harding, Counterspy, starring Reed Hadley
Pilot of TV version of Counterspy starring Don Megowan

Magazine article
Radio and Television Mirror article "by David Harding" with information from "actual cases from the Counterspy files."

American radio dramas
1940s American radio programs
1950s American radio programs
NBC Blue Network radio programs
ABC radio programs
Mutual Broadcasting System programs
1942 radio programme debuts
1957 radio programme endings
Radio programs adapted into films